Politis (meaning "Citizen") is a daily Greek-language newspaper published in Cyprus. It is the second-largest (by circulation) Greek-language newspaper on the island, with about 7,000 copies sold daily, or about 8% of the market.

See also 
List of newspapers in Cyprus

References

External links
 POLITIS.COM.CY Main news portal
 ΓΗΠΕΔΟ - Sports website

Publications established in 1999
Greek-language newspapers published outside Greece
Newspapers published in Cyprus